Fatoumata Diawara (born 1982) is a Malian singer-songwriter currently living in France.

Diawara began her career as an actress in theatre and in film, including Genesis (1999), Sia, The Dream of the Python (2001) and Timbuktu (2014). She later launched a career in music, collaborating with numerous artists and releasing three studio albums beginning with 2011 debut Fatou. Diawara's music combines traditional Wassoulou with international styles.

Early life
Diawara was born in 1982 in the Ivory Coast to Malian parents. As an adolescent, she was sent back to their native Bamako in Mali to be raised by an aunt. When she was eighteen, Diawara moved to France to pursue acting. She briefly returned to Mali for a film role, but fled back to Paris to avoid being coerced into marriage by her family.

Film and theatre
After moving to France, Diawara appeared in Cheick Oumar Sissoko's 1999 feature film Genesis, Dani Kouyaté's popular 2001 film Sia, le rêve du python, and in the internationally renowned street theatre troupe Royal de Luxe.  She also played a leading role in the musical Kirikou et Karaba.

Simultaneously with pursuing her musical career, Diawara has continued her cinematic activities, with numerous roles, appearances, and musical input in multiple feature films, including in Timbuktu, which won seven César Award nods and an Academy Award nomination in 2014.

Musical career
Diawara took up the guitar and began composing her own material, writing songs that blend Wassoulou traditions of southern Mali with international influences. She has said that she is "the first female solo electric guitar player in Mali".

Diawara has performed or recorded with Malian and international stars such as Cheick Tidiane Seck, Oumou Sangaré, AfroCubism, Dee Dee Bridgewater (on Red Earth: A Malian Journey), and the Orchestre Poly Rythmo de Cotonou. The EP Kanou was released May 9, 2011. She wrote every song on her debut album Fatou from World Circuit Records that released in September 2011. (Nonesuch Records released the Kanou EP digitally in North America on September 27, 2011, and the album Fatou on August 28, 2012.)

In September 2012, Diawara was featured in a campaign called "30 Songs / 30 Days" to support Half the Sky, a multi-platform media project inspired by Nicholas Kristof and Sheryl WuDunn's book. September 2012 also saw her board the Africa Express Train with Damon Albarn, Rokia Traoré, Baaba Maal, Amadou & Mariam, Nicolas Jaar, and the Noisettes, amongst many others. The show culminated in a 4.5k venue in Kings Cross where Fatoumata performed with Paul McCartney.

Diawara has spent recent years touring the world, with a landmark performance for the English-speaking public at the 2013 Glastonbury Festival.  Alongside many European gigs, her schedule has taken her to South America, Asia and Australia, as well as on multiple trips to the US, where in September 2013 she performed as part of the Clinton Global Initiative alongside The Roots in New York. Since mid-2014 she has collaborated with Roberto Fonseca, with numerous live performances and a joint live album, At Home - Live in Marciac, along the way. In 2014 she also performed with Mayra Andrade and Omara Portuondo. February 2015 saw her first live concert as an established international star in Mali, her home country, Festival sur le Niger in Ségou, where she shared the stage once again with her long-time friend and mentor, Oumou Sangaré, Bassekou Kouyate, and many other domestic Malian acts.

Diawara was featured in the 2020 Gorillaz single "Désolé", which later appeared on their album Song Machine, Season One: Strange Timez. She performed a Tiny Desk home concert in February 2022. Later that year, she published the album Maliba, created as a soundtrack for a Google Arts and Culture project to digitise manuscripts held in Timbuktu. The album was characterised by The Economist as "a wondrous work of cultural preservation from one of the biggest names in contemporary African music".

Style 
Noted for her "sensuous voice," Diawara sings primarily in Bambara, the national language of Mali, and builds on the tradition of "songs of advice" from the culture of her ancestral Wassoulou region. In her songs, Diawara has addressed issues such as the pain of emigration; a need for mutual respect; the struggles of African women; life under the rule of religious fundamentalists, and the practice of female circumcision. One song that exemplifies her focus on these topics is "Mali-ko (Peace/La Paix)", a seven-minute song and video that criticises the fundamentalist conquest of Northern Mali and urges unity to quell resentment against the Tuareg minority whom some blamed for abetting the incursion. Diawara said about the song, ""I needed to scream with this song, 'Wake up! We are losing Mali! We are losing our culture, our tradition, our origins, our roots!.

Recognition and awards
She received two nominations at the 61st Annual Grammy Awards for Best World Music Album for her album Fenfo and Best Dance Recording for "Ultimatum" in which she was featured with the English band Disclosure.

Filmography 

 1996: Taafe Fanga by Adama Drabo
 1999: La Genèse by Cheick Oumar Sissoko: Dina
 2002: Sia, le rêve du python by Dani Kouyaté: Sia
 2008: Il va pleuvoir sur Conakry, by Cheick Fantamady Camara: Siré
 2010: Encourage, by Eleonora Campanella
 2010: Ni brune ni blonde, by Abderrahmane Sissako
 2011: Les Contes de la Nuit, by Michel Ocelot (voice)
 2013: The Africa Express, by Renaud Barret and Florent de La Tulle: Herself
 2014: Timbuktu (Le chagrin des oiseaux), by Abderrahmane Sissako
 2015: Morbayassa, by Cheick Fantamady Camara: Bella
 2016: Mali Blues, by Lutz Gregor: Herself
 2019: Yao, by Philippe Godeau: Gloria

Stage performances 
 1998: Antigone by Sophocles; adapted by Jean-Louis Sagot Duvauroux, production Sotiguy Kouyaté
 2002–2008: Royal de Luxe; creator Jean-Luc Courcoult
 2007–2008: Kirikou et Karaba: Karaba

Discography

Albums 
 2011:  Fatou (World Circuit/Nonesuch)
 2015: At Home - Live in Marciac, Fatoumata Diawara & Roberto Fonseca (Jazz Village)
 2018: Fenfo (Something To Say) (Wagram Music/Shanachie Records)
 2022: Maliba (3ème Bureau)

Singles and EPs
 2011: Kanou EP (World Circuit/Nonesuch)

Collaborations 
 2009: Featured in the album Léman by Blick Bassy 
 2010: Co-authoring and featuring in the album Debademba by Debademba
 2010: Featured in The Imagine Project by Herbie Hancock
 2010: Featured in the album Jamm by Cheikh Lô 
 2010: Featured in the song "N'fletoun" from the Djekpa La You album by Dobet Gnahoré
 2011: Featured in the song "C'est lui ou c'est moi" from the Cotonou Club album by Orchestre Poly-Rythmo de Cotonou
 2012: Featured in Rocket Juice & the Moon (Honest Jon's - Album)
 2012: Featured in the song "Bibissa" from the album Yo by Roberto Fonseca 
 2012: Featured in the song "Nothin' Can Save Ya" from the album The Bravest Man In The Universe by Bobby Womack
 2013: Featured in the song "Surma" from the Sketches of Ethiopia album by Mulatu Astatke
 2014: Co-authoring and featured in the song "Timbuktu Fasso" from the Timbuktu soundtrack by Amine Bouhafa
 2014: Featured in the song "It's all coming together" by Walter Hus from the soundtrack to feature film N - The Madness of Reason by Peter Krüger
 2018: Featured in the song "Ultimatum" by Disclosure 
 2019: Featured in the song "Cameroon" by Bonaparte (singer)
 2020: Featured in the song "Désolé" by Gorillaz
 2020: Featured in the song "Douha (Mali Mali)" by Disclosure
 2022: Featured in the song ‘Tama’ with Barbara Pravi

With Les Balayeurs du désert 
Via association with Royal de Luxe; several of the songs had been played as accompaniment in Royal de Luxe's 'giant marionettes' street performances throughout the world. 
 2005: Jules Verne Impact by Les Balayeurs du désert (apast – Album) (Y Danse, Hamleti...)  
 2007: La Pequeña by Les Balayeurs du désert (Atelier de l'événement – Album) (with an early version of Salimata)

References

Interview to Fatoumata Diawara during her tour 2022 in Zaragoza. Spain.
Fatoumata Diawara: “my music is a combination of my roots interpreted from my modern perspective”

External links

 
 BBC Radio 3 - World Routes, November 13, 2010, accessed June 8, 2011.
 "Field Report: Festival Sur le Niger 2015" by Tom Pryor, accessed November 11, 2015.
 Chabasseur, Eglantine. "Fatoumata Diawara Reinvented", RFI musique, April 8, 2009, accessed June 8, 2011.
 Cummings, Tim. “Oumou Sangare, Barbican Hall, London”, The Independent, April 28, 2009, accessed June 8, 2011.
 Denselow, Robin. "Orchestre Poly-Rythmo: Cotonou Club", The Guardian, March 24, 2011, accessed June 8, 2011.
 Forgan, Kat. "Staff Brenda Bilili". Songlines, July 2011, pp. 104–105.
 Phillips, Glyn. "AfroCubism", WorldMusic.co.uk, accessed June 8, 2011.

1982 births
Bambara-language singers
Living people
21st-century Ivorian women singers
21st-century Malian women singers
Malian emigrants to France
Malian women's rights activists
People from Bamako